The Mid-America Intercollegiate Athletics Association women's basketball tournament (formerly Missouri Intercollegiate Athletics Association women's basketball tournament) is the annual conference women's basketball championship tournament for the Mid-America Intercollegiate Athletics Association. The tournament has been held annually since 1983. It is a single-elimination tournament and seeding is based on regular season records.

The winner receives the MIAA's automatic bid to the NCAA Division II women's basketball tournament.

Emporia State and Washburn have been the most successful teams at the MIAA tournament, with nine championships each.

History

Championship records

 Lincoln (MO), Newman, Northeastern State (OK), and Rogers State have not yet won made the MIAA tournament finals
 Missouri–Rolla (Missouri S&T), UMSL, Nebraska–Omaha (Omaha), and Truman (Northeast Missouri State) never won the tournament as MIAA members
 Schools highlighted in pink are former members of the MIAA

See also
 MIAA men's basketball tournament

References

NCAA Division II women's basketball conference tournaments
Basketball Tournament, Women's
Recurring sporting events established in 1983